Justo Oscar Laguna (September 25, 1929 – November 3, 2011) was the Roman Catholic bishop of the Roman Catholic Diocese of Morón, Argentina.

Ordained to the priesthood in 1954, Laguna became a bishop in 1975 and retired in 2004.

Notes

20th-century Roman Catholic bishops in Argentina
1929 births
2011 deaths
21st-century Roman Catholic bishops in Argentina
Roman Catholic bishops of Morón
Roman Catholic bishops of San Isidro